The 2019 Pennzoil 400 presented by Jiffy Lube was a Monster Energy NASCAR Cup Series  race held on March 3, 2019, at Las Vegas Motor Speedway in Las Vegas. Contested over 267 laps on the  asphalt intermediate speedway, it was the third race of the 2019 Monster Energy NASCAR Cup Series season.

Report

Background

Las Vegas Motor Speedway, located in Clark County, Nevada outside the Las Vegas city limits and about 15 miles northeast of the Las Vegas Strip, is a  complex of multiple tracks for motorsports racing. The complex is owned by Speedway Motorsports, Inc., which is headquartered in Charlotte, North Carolina.

Entry list

First practice

Qualifying

Qualifying results

Practice (post-qualifying)

Second practice
Second practice session scheduled for Saturday was cancelled due to rain.

Final practice

Race

Stage Results

Stage One
Laps: 80

Stage Two
Laps: 80

Final Stage Results

Stage Three
Laps: 107

Race statistics
 Lead changes: 19 among 9 different drivers
 Cautions/Laps: 2 for 12 (both for end of stage breaks;  first race to go without an incident-related caution since the 2012 Auto Club 400, which went green until the race-ending caution for rain)
 Red flags: 0
 Time of race: 2 hours, 35 minutes and 11 seconds
 Average speed:

Media

Television
Fox Sports covered their 19th race at the Las Vegas Motor Speedway. Mike Joy, 2001 race winner Jeff Gordon and Darrell Waltrip called from the booth for the race. Jamie Little, Vince Welch and Matt Yocum handled the pit road duties for the television side.

Radio
PRN covered the radio call for the race which was simulcasted on Sirius XM NASCAR Radio. Doug Rice and Mark Garrow called the race in the booth when the field raced through the tri-oval. Rob Albright called the race from a billboard in turn 2 when the field raced through turns 1 and 2. Pat Patterson called the race from a billboard outside of turn 3 when the field raced through turns 3 and 4. Brad Gillie, Brett McMillan, Wendy Venturini and Heather DeBeaux worked pit road for the radio side.

Standings after the race

Drivers' Championship standings

Manufacturers' Championship standings

Note: Only the first 16 positions are included for the driver standings.

References

2019 in sports in Nevada
2019 Monster Energy NASCAR Cup Series
March 2019 sports events in the United States
NASCAR races at Las Vegas Motor Speedway